Buqiangge railway station is a station on the Chinese Qinghai–Tibet Railway.  Located at 4,823 m, it is one of the highest railway stations in the world.

Station layout

See also
 Qinghai–Tibet Railway
 List of stations on Qinghai–Tibet railway

References

Railway stations in Qinghai
Stations on the Qinghai–Tibet Railway